Metrolinx mobility hubs are locations with significant levels of planned transit service in the Canadian province of Ontario, as identified by the regional planning transportation agency Metrolinx under The Big Move. A mobility hub consists of a major transit station and the immediate surrounding area, where different forms of transportation come together, serving as the origin, destination or transfer point for a significant amount of trips. It is also a concentrated point of employment, housing, and recreation, making them places of significant economic development and activity where office buildings, hospitals, educational institutions, government service and information centres, shopping malls and restaurants can be located.

Mobility hubs in the GTHA
There are 51 mobility hubs in the Greater Toronto and Hamilton Area (GTHA) that have been identified and profiled by Metrolinx within an 800-metre radius around the transit station. Data has been collected to establish:
 Population and population density
 Employment and job density
 Demographics
 Personal income
 Housing
 Dwelling type and ownership
 People per household
 Travel behaviour
 Travel starting and ending at the hub
 Transportation mode share
 Transportation costs
 Car ownership
 Existing and planned transit service

Of these, Metrolinx has undertaken studies on seven of them that provide a plan for the design and conceptual vision of the mobility hub in the future.

Demographics

Mobility

References

External links
Mobility Hubs: Green Paper 2

Metrolinx